"A Better Love" is a song by British-American dance-pop band Londonbeat, released on 12 November 1990 as the second single from the group's second studio album, In the Blood (1990). It was the follow-up to their international hit "I've Been Thinking About You". "A Better Love" was less successful but still reached the top 20 in several countries, including becoming a top-ten hit in Austria and Canada; it was the 41st-most-successful song of 1991 in the latter country. On the US Billboard Hot 100, the single reached number 18, while on the UK Singles Chart, it peaked at number 24.

Critical reception
Stephen Thomas Erlewine from AllMusic described the song as a "enjoyable" slice of early-'90s "soulful, tuneful dance-pop". Larry Flick from Billboard wrote that it "demonstrates [the] act's versatility and is draped with anthemic drum beats and spacious guitar slides." Steve Morse from Boston Globe felt the group shows some "intoxicating dance rhythms" in songs like "A Better Love". Pan-European magazine Music & Media stated that here, the band "is once again a display of vocal craftsmanship", describing the song as "up-tempo, yet mildly moody and chartbound." Selina Webb from Music Week said that "this is bound to be two in a row for Anxious's most fruitful signing." She added that "the wholesome harmonies are in fine form and this is easily as strong as 'I've Been Thinking About You'."

Track listings
 UK 7-inch single
 "A Better Love" – 3:59
 "K.I.S.S." – 3:35

 German maxi-CD
 "A Better Love" – 3:59
 "She Said She Loves Me" – 4:14
 "K.I.S.S." – 3:35
 "A Better Love" (extended) – 6:25

Charts

Weekly charts

Year-end charts

References

1990 singles
1990 songs
American dance-pop songs
British dance-pop songs
Dance-rock songs
Londonbeat songs
RCA Records singles